Temple Beth-El was a Reform congregation and Romanesque synagogue located at Fifth Avenue and 76th Street in the Upper East Side of Manhattan in New York City.

History 
The congregation was formed on March 27, 1874, with David Einhorn serving as the congregation's first rabbi. Kaufmann Kohler succeeded his father-in-law Einhorn as rabbi in 1879, serving there until he became president of Hebrew Union College in 1903. Rudolph Grossman was associate rabbi of Temple Beth-El from 1889 to 1896. Samuel Schulman was elected associate rabbi in 1901, and in 1903 he succeeded Kohler as rabbi. He continued to serve as its rabbi until its merger in 1927.

The building, dedicated on September 18, 1891, was subsequently demolished in 1947, after having barely been used since Yom Kippur in 1929. In 1927 the Temple Beth-El congregation had merged with Congregation Emanu-El.

Gallery

References

Reform synagogues in New York City
Religious organizations established in 1874
Fifth Avenue
Upper East Side
Demolished buildings and structures in Manhattan
Buildings and structures demolished in 1947
Synagogues completed in 1891